The Southwestern Athletic Conference softball tournament (sometimes known simply as the SWAC Tournament) is the conference championship tournament in college softball for the Southwestern Athletic Conference.  The winner receives the conference's automatic bid to the NCAA Division I softball tournament.

Tournament
The top 8 teams compete in the double-elimination tournament, with the top seed from one division facing the fourth seed from the opposite in the first round and so on.

Champions

Year-by-year

By school

References